Roger B. Turner Jr. is a United States Marine Corps major general who served as the Commanding General of the 1st Marine Division from September 22, 2020, to June 8, 2022. Previously, he served as the Commanding General of the Marine Air-Ground Task Force Training Command and Marine Corps Air Ground Combat Center from 2018 to September 10, 2020.

References

External links

Year of birth missing (living people)
Living people
Place of birth missing (living people)
United States Marine Corps generals